Michael Naranjo is a Native American blind sculptor. Born in Santa Clara Pueblo, NM in 1944, he is a member of the Tewa Tribe. He was raised in Taos, New Mexico. The son of the ceramic artist Rose Naranjo, he made first contact with pottery and art by the side of his mother. He was drawn into the army and served in Vietnam War. During the patrol the Viet Cong soldier threw the grenade that took his sight and maimed his right hand. During the convalescence period he started sculpting in clay. Gradually sculpting became his passion and profession. The first models were made in clay, wax and papier-mache, some were cast in bronze. Later, he used stone in his art. His favorite topics are Native American warrior, a hoop dancer, a female nude, a child, a soldier, a bear or fish or bird.

Awards 
In 1979 his Santa Clara Rain Dancer was awarded First Prize, Best in Class and Best in Division at the Santa Fe Indian Market.

He was honored in 1990 with the Distinguished Achievement Award from the National Press Club in Washington, D.C.

In 1999 he was honored as the LIFE Foundation's Presidential Unsung Hero.

In 2004, he was the recipient of the Santa Fe Rotary Foundation's Distinguished Art Award.

Michael's pieces are included in the collections of The Vatican, Vatican City, Italy; The White House, Washington D.C. and The Heard Museum, Phoenix, Arizona.

Naranjo has become widely recognized. The Italian government allowed Naranjo to mount a specially-built scaffold and to come into actual physical contact with Michelangelo's David in Florence in 1986. This is shown in two PBS videos. He was permitted to "visit by touch" sculptures in Louvre.  In 2019 he visited the National Cowboy & Western Heritage Museum to "visit by touch" James Earle Fraser's sculpture, End of the Trail.

His words inscribed on one of the 18 glass panels of the American Veterans Disabled for Life Memorial in Washington, D.C., were cited by President Obama at the dedication ceremony: "When you're young, you're invincible. You're immortal. I thought I'd come back. Perhaps I wouldn't, there was that thought, too, but I had this feeling that I would come back. Underneath that feeling, there was another, that maybe I wouldn't be quite the same, but I felt I'd make it back."—Michael A. Naranjo </ref>

Notes

References 

1944 births
Living people
Blind artists
20th-century American sculptors
Santa Clara Pueblo people
20th-century Native Americans
21st-century Native Americans
21st-century American sculptors